Hannelore Brenner (born 21 June 1963) is a German Paralympian dressage equestrian athlete.

Life
Brenner was born in Lüneburg in 1963. She was a keen horse rider until a severe fall left her paraplegic.

Brenner took up horse riding again for leisure but then turned to competition. At the Athens Paralympics she took the Silver medal for Individual Freestyle. In 2008 in Beijing she took a Gold medal in both the Individual and the Individual Freestyle as well as gaining a team silver medal. In 2010 at the World Championships she again took Gold in both the Individual and the Individual Freestyle.

At the paralympics in London in 2012 she again won two gold medals and a team silver riding her horse Women of the World.

References

External links
 
 
 
 

1963 births
Living people
People from Lüneburg
Paralympic equestrians of Germany
Medalists at the 2012 Summer Paralympics
Equestrians at the 2012 Summer Paralympics
Medalists at the 2008 Summer Paralympics
Equestrians at the 2008 Summer Paralympics
Medalists at the 2004 Summer Paralympics
Equestrians at the 2004 Summer Olympics
Paralympic gold medalists for Germany
Paralympic silver medalists for Germany
Paralympic medalists in equestrian
Sportspeople from Lower Saxony